The German torpedo boat T18 was one of nine Type 37 torpedo boats built for the  (German Navy) during World War II. Completed in mid-1941, she was later assigned to the Baltic Sea for convoy escort duties. The boat briefly became a training ship in 1942 before she was transferred to France where she laid minefields and escorted Axis blockade runners and U-boats through the Bay of Biscay into the Atlantic Ocean. T18 returned to Germany in mid-1943 and became a training ship again for the Torpedo School and U-boat Flotillas. The boat returned to active duty in mid-1944 and assigned to the Baltic where she was sunk by Soviet aircraft in September.

Design and description
The Type 37 torpedo boat was a slightly improved version of the preceding Type 35 with better range. Their crew numbered 119 officers and sailors.

As built, the Type 37s mounted a single  SK C/32 gun on the stern. Anti-aircraft defense was provided by a single  SK C/30 anti-aircraft (AA) gun superfiring over the 10.5 cm gun and a pair of  C/30 guns on the bridge wings. They carried six above-water  torpedo tubes in two triple mounts amidships and could also carry 30 mines (or 60 if the weather was good).

Modifications
Early-war modifications were limited to the conversion of the foremast into a tripod mast, installation of a FuM 28 radar with fixed antennas angled 45° to each side. T18 received an additional 3.7 cm AA gun on her forecastle after November 1941. Quadruple 2 cm gun mounts began slowly replacing the 3.7 cm gun beginning in May 1942 as the ships were refitted. By 1944, another quadruple mount had been fitted on the searchlight platform amidships in T18 and she received a  Bofors AA gun before her loss in September. It is uncertain if the boat received twin 2 cm gun mounts that replaced the single mounts in the bridge wings before then.

Construction and career
T18 was ordered on 18 September 1937 from Schichau, laid down at their  Elbing, East Prussia, shipyard on 27 July 1939 as yard number 1406, launched on 1 June 1940 and commissioned on 22 November 1941; construction was delayed by shortages of skilled labor and of raw materials. After working up, the boat began convoy escort duties in the Baltic. She was assigned to the Torpedo School as a training ship from May to September 1942 and was then transferred to France. On 5–8 May, the 2nd Torpedo Boat Flotilla with T18 and the torpedo boats T2,  and  laid three minefields in the Channel. The following month the boats returned to the Bay of Biscay to help escort U-boats through the Bay. T18, T2 and T5 arrived back in Germany on 1 July and the former was briefly reassigned to the Torpedo School before she became a training ship for U-boat flotillas in September–November. T18 was refitted at Schichau from December 1943 to May 1944 was then assigned to support German operations in the Baltic. Reassigned to the 3rd Torpedo Boat Flotilla, T18 and her sisters T13 and  sortied into the Archipelago Sea as a show of force on 12–13 September after the Prime Minister of Finland, Antti Hackzell, broke off diplomatic relations with Germany and ordered German forces to leave Finland on 2 September. On the return voyage, T18 was sunk by Soviet aircraft.

Notes

Citations

References

External links
Type 37 on German Navy.de

Type 37 torpedo boats
1940 ships